West End Jungle is a 1961 British film directed by Arnold Louis Miller and starring Andria Lawrence and Vicki Woolf. It focuses on the issue of prostitution.

Context
West End Jungle examined the consequences of the introduction of the Street Offences Act 1959. Until then, as many as 10,000 prostitutes lined the streets and alleys of Soho, facing a deterrent of only a small fine. The film explains what happened when the streets were cleaned up, and it looks at what became of the so-called oldest profession as it continued to operate in Britain.

The film claims that: “The streets of London have been swept, apparently, clean, but the dirt still remains out of sight. It's still there in the West End Jungle”; Labour peer Lord Morrison, in his position as president of the British Board of Film Censors, had West End Jungle banned, declaring that the film would bring London into disrepute.

Content
The scenarios and narration of West End Jungle are sensational, evoking the lurid pulp fiction of the time. The film warns, for example: “by getting in that car she is taking the irrevocable step to degradation and eventual self-disgust”. But the casualties are more often men. Either senior ones taken in by young women who secretly regard them with contempt, or gullible businessmen lured into clubs where hostesses working on commission cajole them into paying for overpriced drinks.

Cast

David Gell: Narrator
Andria Lawrence
Vicki Woolf
Tom Macaulay
Nat Mills as Punter
Heather Russell
Tom Bowman
Terry James
Peter Baker
Denis Cleary
David Grey
Marcel de Villiers
Margaret Trace
George McGrath
Mavis Hoffman
Pamela Rees
Roy Denton
Laurence Hepworth
Marilyn Ridge
Janette Rowsell
Laura Thurlow
Desmond Newling
Valerie Drew
Nicholas Tannar
Jan Williams
Minush Fabinah
Kathleen Grace
Roy Stephens
Michael Lee

Production
The cast included a number of friends and family of the crew; among them, director Miller's uncle, Nat Mills, one half of the “Nat Mills and Bobby” comedy team of the 1940s. Much of the filming was done at night, making the film seem like a time capsule, with the smoky nightclubs, seedy back alleys, and neon signs of 1960s Soho.

References

External links
 

British documentary films
1960s English-language films
1961 films
1961 documentary films
1960s British films